Chondroceras is an extinct genus from a well-known class of fossil cephalopods, the ammonites. It lived during the Jurassic Period,.

References

Jurassic ammonites of North America
Ammonites of Europe
Bajocian life